The Torres Strait Islands are a group of at least 274 small islands in the Torres Strait between Queensland, Australia and Papua New Guinea.

This is a list of the named islands and island groups in the Torres Strait. In addition there are unnamed islands and named and unnamed rocks.

Almost all of the islands in the Torres Strait are part of Australia; consequently all entries in this table are in Australia unless noted as being in Papua New Guinea.

Table of islands

References

External links 
 Torres Strait Atlas

Further reading
 Gadke, Christopher (2001). The architecture of the Torres Strait Islands : from the vernacular to the 'South Sea' type [St. Lucia, Qld.] see http://trove.nla.gov.au/work/32186161?q=subject%3A%22Waraber+Island+%2F+Sue+Islet+(Qld+TSI+SC54-12)%22&c=book

Torres Strait
Torres
Private islands of Australia
Islands of Australia by state or territory